The 2021–22 season is Teuta's 81st season in their history of the Albanian Superliga and came in as the defending champions. Along with the Superliga, the club also participated in the Albanian Supercup, Albanian Cup, and the Champions League qualifying stage. The season began on 11 September 2021 and ended on 26 May 2022.

First team squad 

.

Transfers

Transfers in

Loans in

Transfers out

Loans out

Pre-season friendlies

Competitions

Albanian Superliga

League table

Matches

Albanian Cup

Albanian Supercup

UEFA Champions League

First qualifying round

UEFA Europa Conference League

Second qualifying round

Third qualifying round

Statistics

Appearances and goals

|-
! colspan=16 style=background:#dcdcdc; text-align:center| Goalkeepers

|-
! colspan=16 style=background:#dcdcdc; text-align:center| Defenders

|-
! colspan=16 style=background:#dcdcdc; text-align:center| Midfielders

|-
! colspan=16 style=background:#dcdcdc; text-align:center| Forwards

|-
! colspan=16 style=background:#dcdcdc; text-align:center| Players transferred out during the season

Goalscorers

 Players in italics left the team during the season

Notes

References 

 

2021–22
Teuta
Teuta
Teuta